Koujounotsuki may refer to:
"Kōjō no Tsuki", a Japanese  song from the Meiji period
8957 Koujounotsuki, an asteroid named after the song